Merton Merrill Meixell (October 18, 1887 – August 17, 1982) was a Major League Baseball outfielder who played for one season. He played for the Cleveland Naps for three games during the 1912 Cleveland Naps season.

External links

1887 births
1982 deaths
Major League Baseball outfielders
Cleveland Naps players
Monmouth Browns players
Jacksonville Jacks players
Columbus Discoverers players
Sioux City Packers players
Yazoo City Zoos players
Flint Vehicles players
Evansville River Rats players
Newport News Shipbuilders players
Fargo-Moorhead Graingrowers players
Baseball players from Minnesota
People from Blue Earth County, Minnesota
Beardstown Infants players